The 1994 United States Senate election in Missouri was held November 8, 1994. Incumbent Republican U.S. Senator John Danforth decided to retire and not seek re-election. Former Governor of Missouri John Ashcroft won the open seat in a landslide.

Major candidates

Democratic 
 Alan Wheat, U.S. Representative

Republican 
 John Ashcroft, former Governor of Missouri

Polling

Results

See also 
 1994 United States Senate elections

References 

1994 Missouri elections
Missouri
1994